BlueWay Offshore Norge AS was an offshore helicopter airline based at Stavanger Airport, Sola in Sola, Norway. Established in 2009, it remained until 2014 when the group was sold to Noordzee Helikopters Vlaanderen.

History
The BlueWay Group had its basis in an ownership constellation for Airlift, a land-based helicopter operator. BlueWay was created when the Reiten Group bought part sixty percent of the stake in Airlift, with Helicopter Transport Group selling down from one hundred to forty percent.

BlueWay Offshore was incorporated in 2009. Its first major contract came in 2012, when it signed with Royall Dutch Shell for transport to the fields Draugen and Ormen Lange. The latter required the company to establish a base at Kristiansund Airport, Kvernberget. The same year it signed another agreement with Shell, this time in the Danish sector, with services commencing on 1 July 2014.

BlueWay was taken over by Noordzee Helikopters Vlaanderen in 2014.

References

Defunct airlines of Norway
Defunct helicopter airlines
Airlines established in 2009
2009 establishments in Norway
Companies based in Sola, Norway
Airlines disestablished in 2014
2014 disestablishments in Norway